James O. Naifeh (born June 16, 1939), usually known as Jimmy Naifeh, is an American politician and member of the Democratic Party from the State of Tennessee. He served as the Speaker of the Tennessee House of Representatives from 1991 to 2009, serving longer in that position than anyone else in Tennessee history.

Early life
Naifeh is a second-generation Lebanese-American from Covington, a town north of Memphis. His family was in the grocery business and has hosted an annual Naifeh Family Coon Supper since 1945. Following his graduation from the University of Tennessee, Naifeh served in the United States Army as an infantry officer.

Political career

Election to the House
He was first elected to the Tennessee House of Representatives in 1974, and was Speaker from 1991 to 2009. He represents House District 81, which includes most of Tipton County and all of Haywood County. Prior to his election as Speaker served in other positions in the Democratic Caucus such as chairman of the Rules Committee, Majority Floor Leader, and chairman of the Rural West Tennessee Democratic Caucus.

Marriage
From 1995 to 2008, Naifeh was married to Betty Anderson, considered by many Tennessee political observers to be the most influential lobbyist in the state. Naifeh's detractors saw this as a conflict of interest. Naifeh's reply was that she had no undue influence over him in any area of legislation and that she had been in that profession for many years before the personal relationship between them began, so it is hardly as if she entered the field once she married the Speaker as a way of offering access to him.

Partisan activities
Naifeh is considered a master of parliamentary procedure and tactics, which is very important in that the Speaker of the House in Tennessee generally personally presides over all sessions of the chamber. He is also regarded as being very partisan, particularly by his Republican opponents, who have long made him a "target" for defeat. In the most recent redistricting, much of the southern portion of Naifeh's native Tipton County was removed from his district. Many suggest that this was because Memphis suburbanites, who are generally quite conservative and reliable Republican voters with no long-term ties to Tipton County, would vote to replace Naifeh with a conservative Republican. However, he easily defeated retired Air Force colonel Tony Lopez in 2002.

Contested 2004 election
In December 2002, African American physician Dr. Jesse Cannon, a Republican and Naifeh's personal physician, announced that he would oppose Naifeh in 2004. Dr. Cannon counted heavily on support from outside the immediate region and was fairly successful raising campaign funds among affluent Republicans in the Nashville area.

In an interesting dynamic to the race, the only other county in the district, added in the most recent redistricting, Haywood County, is Tennessee's only black-majority county. However, on November 2, 2004, Naifeh defeated Cannon by a margin of approximately 58% to 42%.

Challenges to speakership
The Democratic majority in the Tennessee House was narrowed to 53-46 by the overall statewide outcome of this election. Shortly after the election some pundits suggested scenarios in which another Democrat considered to be less partisan, such as Frank Buck of Dowelltown in Middle Tennessee, could have been elected Speaker if he could get the unanimous support of the Republican minority and the help of a few dissident Democrats from the eastern two-thirds of the state.

From 1973 until January 2007, when state senator John S. Wilder was defeated in his reelection bid for the speakership of the state senate, both houses of the Tennessee General Assembly had been led by West Tennesseans. However, Republicans could not agree on a replacement, and when the issue came to a vote (Buck declined to be nominated), nine Republicans joined with all of the Democrats to reelect Naifeh. These Republican members were warned of the possibility, even the probability, of facing officially-party-endorsed opponents in the August 2006 primary election, should they choose to stand for another term.

Republican majority in 2008
In the 2008 November elections Republicans won the majority of the state House, winning 50 of the 99 seats, with the Democrats holding 49. This is the first time the GOP has had a majority in the Tennessee House since 1971, and the first time both House and Senate have had Republican majorities since Reconstruction. This ended Naifeh's long term as Speaker, but the Republicans' narrow majority in the House did not allow them to elect their preferred Speaker. While 49 Republicans voted for Jason Mumpower, the 49 Democrats and Republican Representative Kent Williams voted for Williams to succeed Naifeh as Speaker.

Naifeh, who was chairing the House for the last time, helped to engineer Williams' election by instructing the House clerk to depart from the normal practice of conducting a roll call of the members in alphabetical order, instead calling first on the Democrats, then on the Republicans. This allowed Williams to vote last, so that before he voted he knew that his vote for himself would be the deciding vote.

Retirement
On March 8, 2012; Naifeh announced he would not run for a 20th term in November. By the time of his retirement, he was the only elected Democrat above the county level in much of his district. While he had remained popular over the years, it had long been very likely that his seat would be taken by a Republican once he retired.

References

1939 births
Living people
People from Covington, Tennessee
University of Tennessee alumni
Military personnel from Tennessee
American politicians of Lebanese descent
Speakers of the Tennessee House of Representatives
Democratic Party members of the Tennessee House of Representatives
20th-century American politicians
21st-century American politicians